Rashid is the transliteration of two male given names:
It also means 'the high one'.

Given name
Rashid III ibn Ahmad Al Mu'alla, former ruler of Umm al-Quwain, part of the United Arab Emirates
Rashid Ali, Danish cricketer
Rashid Ali, Singer, Musician and composer
Rashied Ali, American avant-garde jazz drummer
Raashid Alvi, Indian politician
Rachid Arma, Moroccan footballer
Rashid Baz, Lebanese convicted murderer
Rashid Behbudov, Azerbaijani singer
Rachid Bouaita (born 1974), French boxer
Rashed Al Hooti, Bahraini footballer
Rashid Khalidi, Palestinian-American historian
Rashid bin Abdullah Al Khalifa, Bahraini royal
Räshid Hakimsan, Finnish Tatar hockey player
Rashid Khan (actor), Indian actor
Rashid Khan (cricketer), Afghan cricketer
Rashid Khan (Pakistani cricketer), Pakistani cricketer
Rashid Khan (golfer), Indian golfer
Rashid Khan (musician), Indian musician
Rashid Khan Gaplanov, Azerbaijani statesman
Prince Moulay Rachid of Morocco
Al-Rashid of Morocco, Sultan of Morocco from 1666 to 1672
Rashid Latif, Pakistani cricket player
Rashid Mahazi, Australian footballer
Rashid Al Marikhi, Sufi shaikh in Bahrain
Rasheed Muhammad, Pakistani tissue seller and murderer
Rashid Nezhmetdinov, Soviet chess player
Rashid Nurgaliyev, Russian military officer
Rashid Ramzi, Moroccan athlete
Rashid Rana, Pakistani visual artist
Rashid Rauf, alleged Al-Qaeda operative
Rashid Sarwar, Scottish footballer
Rashid Shaheed (born 1998), American football player
Rashid Taha, French-Algerian rock-rai musician and activist
Rasheed Wallace, American basketball player
Rashid Yasemi, Iranian poet
Rachid Yazami, French-Moroccan scientist known for his work on lithium batteries
Brother Rachid

Surname
Abdullah Rasheed
Adil Rashid, English cricketer
Shaun Rashid, English cricketer
Ahmad Baba Rachid, Algerian musician
Ahmed Rashid, Pakistani author and former revolutionary
Amin Abu Rashid, Palestinian Dutch Hamas leader
Ashraf Rashid, Pakistani general
Harun al-Rashid, Caliph of Baghdad (lived 763-809)
Al-Rashid (12th century), Caliph of Baghdad (ruled 1135–1136)
Kameelah Janan Rasheed, American writer
Kamran Rasheed, Pakistani cricketer
Karim Rashid, American industrial designer
Khalid Rashid, Pakistani Guantanamo detainee
Khalida Rashid Khan, first female judge in the Superior Judiciary of Pakistan
Leila Rachid, Paraguayan diplomat
Mamunur Rashid, Bangladeshi actor, director, scriptwriter
Mohamed Al Rashed, Sudanese footballer
Mohammad Rashed, Kuwaiti footballer
Mohammad Rashid, Sierra Leonean footballer
Muhammad Abdul Rashid, Pakistani hockey player (b. 1941)
Muhammad Rashid (field hockey), recent Pakistani hockey player
Richard Rashid, American computer science researcher
Roger Rasheed, Australian tennis coach and commentator

See also
Raschid
Rashida (disambiguation)
Reşid
Rachid (disambiguation)
Abdul Rashid (name)
Arshad (disambiguation)

Arabic-language surnames
Arabic masculine given names
Iranian masculine given names
Pakistani masculine given names
Surnames of Maldivian origin
Maldivian-language surnames